Telekgerendás is a small village in Békés County, in the Southern Great Plain region of south-east Hungary.

Geography
It covers an area of 72.37 km² and has a population of 1418 people (2015).

References

Populated places in Békés County